John Philip King (1797 – 4 October 1842) was an English cricketer with amateur status who was associated with Suffolk and made his first-class debut in 1830.

References

1797 births
1842 deaths
English cricketers
English cricketers of 1826 to 1863
Suffolk cricketers